Kudara may refer to:
 Kudara, the Japanese name for Baekje, an old Korean Kingdom
 Kudara, Republic of Buryatia, a rural locality in Kabansky District, Republic of Buryatia, Russia
 Kudara no Konikishi, a Japanese clan
 Kudara Kannon, a Buddhist sculptures of the Asuka period that is a treasure of the Hōryū-ji temple.